George Milligan may refer to:

 George Milligan (physician) (?-1799), American surgeon 
George Milligan (moderator) (1860–1934), Scottish minister of the Church of Scotland 
 George Milligan (politician) (born 1934), American politician in the state of Iowa
 George Milligan (footballer) (1891–?), Scottish footballer
 George Milligan (Biblical scholar) (1860–1934), professor at Warwick University